FERM, RhoGEF and pleckstrin domain-containing protein 2 is a protein that in humans is encoded by the FARP2 gene.

Model organisms 

Model organisms have been used in the study of FARP2 function. A conditional knockout mouse line, called Farp2tm1a(KOMP)Wtsi was generated as part of the International Knockout Mouse Consortium program — a high-throughput mutagenesis project to generate and distribute animal models of disease to interested scientists.

Male and female animals underwent a standardized phenotypic screen to determine the effects of deletion. Twenty four tests were carried out on mutant mice and two significant abnormalities were observed. Homozygous mutant animals had a thickened cerebral cortex and displayed abnormal hair shedding.

Interactions 

FARP2 has been shown to interact with PDZK1.

References

Further reading

External links 
 

Genes mutated in mice